Terre Haute is a city in and the county seat of Vigo County, Indiana, United States, about 5 miles east of the state's western border with Illinois. As of the 2010 census, the city had a population of 60,785 and its metropolitan area had a population of 170,943.

Located along the Wabash River, Terre Haute is one of the largest cities in the Wabash Valley and is known as the Queen City of the Wabash. The city is home to multiple higher-education institutions, including Indiana State University, Rose-Hulman Institute of Technology, and Ivy Tech Community College of Indiana.

History
Terre Haute's name is derived from the French phrase terre haute (pronounced  in French), meaning "highland". It was named by French-Canadian explorers and fur trappers to the area in the early 18th century to describe the unique location above the Wabash River (see French colonization of the Americas). At the time, the area was claimed by the French and British and these highlands were considered the border between Canada and Louisiana.

The construction of Fort Harrison in 1811 marked the known beginning of a permanent population of European-Americans. A Wea Indian village already existed near the fort, and the orchards and meadows they kept a few miles south of the fort became the site of the present-day city. (Terre Haute's currently affiliated Order of the Arrow lodge of the Boy Scouts of America is named after the last leader of the Wea village, Jacco Godfroy.) The village of Terre Haute, then a part of Knox County, Indiana, was platted in 1816.

Terre Haute became the county seat of the newly formed Vigo County in 1818, leading to increased population growth. The village's estimated 1,000 residents voted to incorporate in 1832; the village was elevated to city status in 1853.

Early Terre Haute was a center of farming, milling, and pork processing. However, the city's pre-1960 business and industrial expansion occurred largely due to transportation. The Wabash River, the building of the National Road (now US 40), and the Wabash and Erie Canal linked Terre Haute to the world and broadened the city's range of influence. The economy was based on iron and steel mills, hominy plants, and late in the 19th century, distilleries, breweries, and bottle makers. Coal mines and coal operating companies developed to support the railroads, yet agriculture remained predominant, largely due to the role of corn in making alcoholic beverages and food items.

With steady growth and development in the latter part of the 19th century, the city's vibrant neighborhoods benefited from improved fire protection, the founding of two hospitals, dozens of churches, and a number of outlets for amusement. Terre Haute's position as an educational hub was fostered as several institutions of higher education were established. The city developed a reputation for its arts and entertainment offerings. Grand opera houses were built that hosted hundreds of operas and theatrical performances. It became a stop on the popular vaudeville circuit. The development of the streetcar system and later the electric-powered trolleys in the 1890s allowed residents to travel with ease to baseball games, picnics, river excursions, amusement parks, and even horse racing. The famous "Four-Cornered" Racetrack, now the site of Memorial Stadium, was laid out in 1886 and drew the best of the country's trotters and drivers.

On the evening of Easter Sunday, March 23, 1913, a major tornado struck the city around 9:45 pm, demolishing more than 300 homes, killing 21 people, and injuring 250. Damage to local businesses and industries was estimated at $1 million to $2 million (in 1913 dollars). Up to that time, it was the deadliest tornado to hit Indiana. Heavy rains followed the tornado, causing the Wabash River to rise. By midday on Tuesday, March 25, West Terre Haute (Taylorville) was three-quarters submerged.

Like all U.S. communities, Terre Haute experienced economic swings as the country's economic base evolved.

World War II brought an economic upswing with the development of three ordnance plants in the county and the revitalization of the coal, railroad, and agriculture industries. Terre Haute remained dependent on consumer manufacturers such as Quaker Maid, the world's largest food processing factory under one roof. The city was an enthusiastic participant in the war effort with troop send-offs, victory gardens, bond sales, civil defense drills, parades, and ceremonies. The country's 100th United Service Organizations (USO) facility opened in the city in 1943.

Following the war, Terre Haute gained several new factories: Pfizer (1948), Allis-Chalmers (1951), Columbia Records (1954), and Anaconda Aluminum (1959). As traffic began to concentrate at the U.S. 41 interchange, many downtown businesses relocated to Honey Creek Mall shopping center, built in 1968.

Throughout the period, civic groups developed to work toward boosting the economy. The Terre Haute Committee for Area Progress developed the Fort Harrison Industrial Park in the 1970s. Grow Terre Haute in the mid-1980s encouraged the establishment of new stores, factories, and high-tech industrial parks that helped to stabilize the economy and enhance community life. Most encouraging was the arrival of the Digital Audio Disc Corporation (DADC), a subsidiary of the global company, Sony, as the first American factory designed exclusively to make compact discs. In other developments over these years, railroad overpasses eased traffic congestion, law enforcement strengthened, and several national and state awards for volunteerism and citizen participation boosted local pride.

Like other Midwest manufacturing cities, Terre Haute faced daunting challenges as it neared the end of the 20th century, including the outmigration of the population and the closure of long-time manufacturing operations.

Much of the city's resiliency can be attributed to the diversity of the local economy. Manufacturing continues to be an important part of that, due to the formation of the Vigo County Industrial Park. The efforts of the Terre Haute Economic Development Corporation, in cooperation with city and county government, have made the industrial park home to some of the world's leading companies – Companhia Siderúrgica Nacional’s  cold-rolled steel-processing facility, Staples Corporation’s Midwest Distribution Center, Advics automotive brake systems manufacturing facility, ThyssenKrupp Presta’s automotive steering systems manufacturing facility, and CertainTeed’s fiber cement board manufacturing plant.

The revitalization of the downtown area can be traced to the construction of First Financial Bank's new headquarters building in the late 1980s and the creation of the city's first tax increment financing  district, which funded the first downtown parking structure. Over the years, more initiatives followed, including the construction of several new office buildings and a second downtown parking structure.

With the efforts of nonprofit groups such as Downtown Terre Haute and the expansion of the campus of Indiana State University, changes have spurred growth downtown. Several new hotels and businesses have been added to the "Crossroads of America" near 7th and Wabash, outdoor events and festivals attract crowds nearly every weekend during the summer, and the 7th Street Arts Corridor and Terre Haute Children's Museum, completed in 2010, enhance the appeal of the downtown area. These developments over several years inspired property owners throughout downtown to rehabilitate and renovate their buildings, including Hulman & Company. A new $25 million convention center is in the works for downtown Terre Haute, with completion planned for 2021

Renovation of the city's 1930s-era Federal Building to house Indiana State University's Scott College of Business in 2010  and development of a new downtown location for Indiana State University Foundation and the university's bookstore in 2011  strengthened ties between the city and the university. In 2015, Indiana State University partnered with developers to build a student housing facility in the heart of downtown, and other downtown residential development followed.

A casino has been proposed to be built on the east side of the city near U.S. Route 40/Indiana Route 46. A referendum in November 2019 on whether to allow the casino to be built passed overwhelmingly.

Geography

The Wabash River dominates the city's geography, forming its western border. Small bluffs on the east side of town mark the edge of the historic flood plain. Lost Creek and Honey Creek drain the city's northern and southern sections, respectively. In the late 19th century (particularly during the oil craze of 1889), several oil and mineral wells were productive in and near the center of town. Pioneer Oil of Lawrenceville, Illinois, began drilling for oil at 10th and Chestnut Streets on the Indiana State University campus in December 2013, the first oil well drilled in downtown Terre Haute since 1903.

Terre Haute is at the intersection of two major roadways: U.S. 40, originally from California to Maryland, and US 41, from Copper Harbor, Michigan, to Miami, Florida. US 41 is now locally named 3rd Street, but historically was 7th Street, making "7th and Wabash" the Crossroads of America.

Climate
Climate in the city is characterized by relatively high summer temperatures, mean winter temperatures near freezing, and evenly distributed precipitation throughout the year. The Köppen climate classification this climate is Dfa (humid continental).

Demographics

2010 census
As of the census of 2010, 60,785 people, 22,645 households, and 12,646 families were residing in the city, with 107,878 people residing in Vigo County. The racial makeup of the city was 83.5% White, 10.9% African American, 0.4% Native American, 1.4% Asian, 0.8% from other races, and 2.9% from two or more races. Hispanics or Latinos of any race were 3.1% of the population.

Of the 22,645 households, 28.8% had children under 18 living with them, 35.0% were married couples living together, 15.7% had a female householder with no husband present, 5.1% had a male householder with no wife present, and 44.2% were not families. About 34.9% of all households were made up of individuals, and 12.2% had someone living alone who was 65 or older. The average household size was 2.29, and the average family size was 2.95.

The median age in the city was 32.7 years. About 20% of residents were under 18; 18.3% were between 18 and 24, 26.4% were from 25 to 44, 22.6% were from 45 to 64, and 12.6% were 65 or older. The gender makeup of the city was 51.6% male and 48.4% female.

2000 census
As of the census of 2000, 59,614 people, 22,870 households, and 13,025 families lived in the city. The racial makeup of the city was 86.3% White, 9.8% African American, 0.3% Native American, 1.2% Asian, 0.5% from other races, and 1.9% from two or more races. About 1.6% of the population was Hispanic or Latino of any race.

Of the 22,870 households, 27.2% had children under 18 living with them, 39.0% were married couples living together, 14.0% had a female householder with no husband present, and 43.0% were not families. About 34.9% of all households were made up of individuals, and 14.1% had someone living alone who was 65 or older. The average household size was 2.28, and the average family size was 2.95.

The median income for a household in the city was $28,018, and for a family was $37,618. Males had a median income of $29,375 versus $21,374 for females. The per capita income for the city was $15,728. 19.2% of the population and 14.8% of families were below the poverty line. Of the total population, 17.4% of those under the age of 18 and 11.4% of those 65 and older were living below the poverty line.

Economy

Major employers 

 Advics
 Amcor
 Casey's General Stores
 City of Terre Haute
 United States Federal Correctional Complex
 First Financial Bank
 GE Aviation has two facilities, a large structures fabrication facility, and a component repair facility
 Indiana State University
 Ivy Tech Community College
 Rose-Hulman Institute of Technology
 Sony Digital Audio Disc Corporation (Sony DADC)
 Taghleef Industries, Inc
 Terre Haute Regional Hospital
 Union Associated Physicians
 Union Hospital
 Vigo County School Corporation
 Vigo County
 Wabash Valley Correctional Facility

Terre Haute Federal Correctional Complex

Terre Haute is the location of the Federal Correctional Complex on Highway 63, two miles south of the city. The complex includes a medium-security federal correctional institution and a high-security United States penitentiary. The penitentiary houses the Special Confinement Unit for inmates serving federal death sentences and contains the federal government's execution chamber. The Terre Haute prison experiments were conducted here in 1943 and 1944 by Dr. John C. Cutler.

Arts and culture
Terre Haute has made an effort to revitalize the businesses and culture in its downtown district. Festivals, museums, restaurants, shopping, and the addition of multiple hotels in the area have greatly improved the overall image of downtown Terre Haute. Its revitalization efforts were recognized in 2010 when the Indiana Chamber of Commerce named Terre Haute Indiana's Community of the Year.

Arts

Located on 7th Street between Wabash Avenue and Ohio Street, Terre Haute Arts Corridor includes the Swope Art Museum and two galleries - the Halcyon Contemporary Art Gallery and Gopalan Contemporary Art. The first Friday of every month, the area features art openings, musical performances, and socializing.

The Swope Art Museum, open and free to the public since 1942, has a collection of American art, including work by Edward Hopper, Grant Wood, Thomas Hart Benton, Janet Scudder, Andy Warhol, Ruth Pratt Bobbs, Robert Motherwell, Robert Rauschenberg, and many others.

The Turman Art Gallery at Indiana State University features rotating exhibitions by student and faculty artists. In 2007, the university was the recipient of nearly 150 Andy Warhol photographs and prints as part of the Andy Warhol Photographic Legacy Program. These additions were to be added to the other Andy Warhol prints already held in the university's permanent collection. The gallery's Permanent Art Collection and Study Collection includes a total of 3,600 paintings, sculptures, ceramics, drawings, prints, and photographs.

The cornerstone of the Terre Haute Arts Corridor is the historic Indiana Theater. The theater, which had long sat vacant, was recently restored and is being used for concerts, film screenings, and other events.

Terre Haute is home to several arts nonprofits, including Wabash Valley Art Spaces and Arts Illiana.

Performing arts
Community Theatre of Terre Haute presented its first shows in 1928. A staple of the Terre Haute arts scene, Community Theatre is a volunteer theatre producing five varied main stage plays and musical productions per year.

Terre Haute also features the Crossroads Repertory Theatre, a professional theater company with over a 40-year history. Its season is mid-June through late-July and performances include classic and new plays and musicals, as well as educational programs and staged reading of new plays.

Hatfield Hall is home to a 602-seat theater on the campus of Rose-Hulman Institute of Technology. A performing arts series has been held annually at Hatfield Hall for over 10 years. Indiana State University holds a performing arts series on its campus, as well. The performances of both series range from Broadway musicals, musical acts, and plays to lectures and dance productions.

Music 

Terre Haute has multiple music venues and a strong music community. The Wabash Valley Musicians Hall of Fame recognizes local musicians yearly.

Locally, the Blues at the Crossroads Festival brings more than 15,000 blues fans to the city the second weekend of September each year. A statewide high-school jazz festival is hosted annually by the Phi Mu Alpha chapter at Indiana State University. Terre Haute is also the birthplace of musician/actor Scatman Crothers.

The Terre Haute Symphony Orchestra, established in 1926, is the oldest professional orchestra in Indiana, antedating the Indianapolis Symphony by four years. The Terre Haute Symphony started as a volunteer group of musicians who provided community entertainment, and has evolved into a group of paid professional musicians who complete auditions to demonstrate their skill level. A series of concerts is offered from September through April, as well as a free Children's Concert for about 3,000 fourth graders from the Wabash Valley.

Terre Haute is also home to various other music organizations, such as the Terre Haute Community Band, Terre Haute Sinfonietta Pops Orchestra, Terre Haute Children's Choir, Terre Haute Masterworks Chorale, Banks of the Wabash Chorus (which performs in Harmony Hall), the Sweet Harmony Women's Barbershop Chorus, and the Wabash Valley Musicians Hall of Fame.

Terre Haute native Paul Dresser was a late 19th-century singer, actor, songwriter, and music publisher, who became "one of the most important composers of the 1890s". In 1913, the Indiana General Assembly named Dresser's biggest hit, "On the Banks of the Wabash, Far Away" as the state song of Indiana. The Paul Dresser Birthplace in Fairbanks Park is listed on the National Register of Historic Places. The Vigo County Historical Society operates the property as a museum, open by appointment. In 2014, a bronze sculpture, sponsored by Art Spaces and created by Teresa Clark to celebrate the composer, was dedicated in Fairbanks Park near the Dresser House.

Museums

The Vigo County Historical Society Museum boasts a collection of artifacts in downtown Terre Haute into a 40,000 square foot, four-level building constructed in 1895. A triangle of museums is located downtown, with the Terre Haute Children's Museum and the Clabber Girl Museum just blocks away.

The three-story Children's Museum is at the intersection of Wabash Avenue and Eighth Street in downtown Terre Haute. It is a hands-on science and technology museum that has educated over 230,000 adults and children from over 22 counties in Indiana and Illinois. It has traveling exhibits focused on weather and space that educate children of Wabash Valley schools. The museum is a participant in a national consortium of 14 science and technology museums.

The Clabber Girl Museum is at Wabash and Ninth Street in downtown Terre Haute. Housed in the Hulman & Company building built in 1892, the museum has exhibits on the history of Clabber Girl, one of the oldest brands in America, and on the art of baking. The museum is adjacent to the building where the Clabber Girl Baking Powder is still manufactured today.

Kleptz Antique Auto Museum, at 625 Poplar Street, displays antique cars, motorcycles, and other auto memorabilia. Styles include a 1902 clear plastic car, a 1963 Chrysler Turbine, and a 1932 Duesenberg with a Judkins body.

The CANDLES Holocaust Museum and Education Center, created by Holocaust survivor Eva Mozes Kor, has exhibits and artifacts related to the Holocaust, eugenics, and forgiveness.

The Indiana Association of Track and Field and Cross-Country Museum is a new addition to the Terre Haute Convention and Visitors Bureau.

Terre Haute was the home of Socialist Party of America leader and five-time presidential nominee Eugene V. Debs. His former home is now a museum on the campus of Indiana State University. It was declared a National Historic Landmark in 1966 and is now owned and operated by the Debs Foundation. The interior of the museum features many of Debs’ possessions and other artifacts from his lifetime. It is open to the public.

Sports
The Terre Haute Rex is Terre Haute's collegiate summer baseball team, founded in 2010. A member of the Prospect League, the team plays its home games at Bob Warn Field at ISU's Sycamore Stadium, The Rex's season runs from late May through early August. The team gets its name from a product with a historic connection to the community, Rex Coffee, roasted and packed in downtown Terre Haute by Clabber Girl Corporation and for many years a household name across the Midwest.

The Rex is building on a rich history of professional baseball in Terre Haute, stretching back to 1884, that includes some of the most famous names associated with the game, including Hall-of-Famers Mordecai Brown and Max Carey, Josh Devore, Negro League baseball all-star Junius Bibbs, Vic Aldridge, Art Nehf (who holds the National League record for most World Series games pitched), Paul "Dizzy" Trout, Jim "Jumbo" Elliott, Harry Taylor, and Bill Butland. More recent professional stars include pitcher Tommy John (who won 288 games in his 26-year major league career) and catcher Brian Dorsett, both of whom played for the New York Yankees during their careers. Terre Haute North graduate Josh Phegley is a member of the Oakland A's, and Terre Haute South graduate A.J. Reed moved up to the Houston Astros in 2016.

Terre Haute was represented for 53 season in various leagues, chiefly the Central League and the Three-I League, winning seven titles (1901, 1922, 1924, 1932, 1950, 1952, and 1953) during that time.

Parks and recreation
Terre Haute has been recognized as a Tree City USA by the Division of Forestry for the Indiana Department of Natural Resources since 1999, and also received the Growth Award, which denotes a higher standard of excellence for urban forestry management. Indiana State University is one of four Tree Campuses in the state.

Terre Haute Parks Department

Some highlights of the Terre Haute Parks Department include:
It is home to the Oakley Playground, Clark-Lansdbaum Holly Arboretum, an 18-hole disc golf course, a public pool, the Spirit of Terre Haute Miniature Train, and a variety of sport facilitiesn including basketball and tennis courts.
It is used for running, walking, biking, and rollerblading.

LaVern Gibson Championship Cross-Country Course
The LaVern Gibson Championship Cross Country Course has the distinction of being one of the few purpose-built cross-country courses in the world. The facility is part of  that comprise the Wabash Valley Family Sports Center east of Terre Haute. Indiana State University's cross-country team uses the Gibson Course for its home meets. The course has also hosted NCAA national championship meets..

Government

Duke Bennett began his fourth term as Terre Haute's mayor in January 2020.

The city council has six members, each representing a district, and three at-large members.

Education

Terre Haute is served by the Vigo County School Corporation. The corporation manages 18 elementary schools, five middle schools, three high schools, and two alternative schools, enrolling 14,642 students from kindergarten to grade 12.

Terre Haute is also home to several higher-education establishments.

Indiana State University (ISU) is in downtown Terre Haute. It has an enrollment around 12,000. The Princeton Review placed ISU on its "Best in the Midwest" list of college and universities for nine consecutive years. ISU was also included in the Forbes' "America's Top 650 Colleges."

Rose-Hulman Institute of Technology is a private engineering school just east of the city. For 20 consecutive years, U.S. News & World Report has ranked it the nation's number-one undergraduate engineering school among institutions whose highest degree in engineering is the master's. It has an enrollment near 2,200 students on its  campus.

Ivy Tech Community College, a full-service community college and part of the statewide system, is also in Terre Haute.

The city has a lending library, the Vigo County Public Library.

Media

Newspaper
Tribune Star

Magazines
Terre Haute Living
Wabash Valley Business Monthly

Television
 WTWO - NBC affiliate - Channel 2.1 (Laff - 2.2; Court TV Mystery - 2.3; Antenna TV - 2.4)
 WTHI - CBS affiliate - Channel 10.1 (Fox/MyNet - 10.2; CW - 10.3; Ion - 10.4; Dabl - 10.5 (coming soon))
 WAWV - ABC affiliate - Channel 38.1 (Grit - 38.2; Bounce - 38.3)

Radio
WISU - 89.7 FM - NPR (Rebroadcasts WFYI)
WZIS - 90.7 FM - Variety
WHOJ - 91.9 FM - Religious (Catholic)
WFNB - 92.7 FM - Active Rock
WEHP - 93.7 FM - Silent
W236AE - 95.1 FM - Classical (Rebroadcasts 103.7 WFIU)
WHLR - 95.9 FM - Classic Country
WMKI-LP - 96.9 FM - Goodtime Oldies
WWVR - 98.5 FM - Classic Rock
WTHI - 99.9 FM - Country
WMGI - 100.7 FM - Top40/Pop 
WBOW - 102.7 FM - Classic Hits
WVIG - 105.5 FM - Classic country
WYLJ - 107.5 FM - Religious (3ABN Radio)
WAMB - 1130 AM / 99.5 FM / 106.9 FM - Adult Standards
WIBQ - 1230 AM / 97.9 FM - News Talk
WPFR - 1480 AM - Silent

Infrastructure

Transportation

Airports
Two airports serve Terre Haute. The Terre Haute Regional Airport is home to Hulman Field (HUF). The airport has a partnership with multiple military units including the 181st Intelligence Wing of the Indiana Air National Guard. It also houses a flight academy through ISU.

Highways
 Interstate 70 to St. Louis (west) and Indianapolis (east): Terre Haute is served by multiple exits. Exit 11 connects with State Road 46, and Exit 7 connects with U.S. 41 on the southwest side of the city. Exit 3 serves West Terre Haute, Indiana, via Darwin Road, which provides easy access to downtown Terre Haute via US 150. Exit 1 onto National Drive is marked for both Terre Haute and West Terre Haute, but is only accessible via the eastbound lanes of I-70.
  US 40 to Effingham (west) and Indianapolis (east). Travels with Interstate 70. US 40 ran through Terre Haute on Wabash Ave., but in January 2011 INDOT gave the road to the city and paid the city to take care of Wabash Ave.
  US 41 to Rockville (north) and Evansville (south). It is the main north–south thoroughfare on Terre Haute's west side. From Maple St. south to I-70, it is marked as 3rd St.; along this stretch is US-41's interchange with I-70.
  US 150 enters Terre Haute from neighboring West Terre Haute, Indiana. At 3rd St., US-150 turns south, following the path of US-41.
  begins at its intersection with US 40 just west of Rose-Hulman. From here, the highway runs south with US 40 to an interchange with I-70. The road then heads through Riley on its way to Bloomington.
  enters Terre Haute on the city's north side crossing the Wabash River. SR 63 ends at the interchange with US 41 on the north side of town.
 , also known as the Terre Haute Bypass, is a limited access highway running from the interchange of IN-46 and I-70 to US-41 near the industrial park on the city's southside.

Bus service
All city and intercity buses serve the downtown Cherry Street Multi-Modal Transportation Facility. 
 The Terre Haute Transit Utility provides bus service via seven day and three evening routes throughout the city. The system's ridership in 2012 was 376,763.
 Greyhound Lines provides interstate bus service (St. Louis—Indianapolis).
 Miller Transportation Hoosier Ride provides daily round trip express and local bus service to Indianapolis.

Railways
Historically, the city was a rail hub. The New York Central Railroad used the Big Four Depot. Its last train was the St. Louis-New York City Southwestern Limited in 1967. The last train serving Terre Haute, Amtrak's Kansas City, Missouri-New York City train, National Limited, stopped running in 1979.

The Chicago & Eastern Illinois Railroad, Chicago, Milwaukee, St. Paul and Pacific Railroad ('Milwaukee Road') and the Pennsylvania Railroad used Union Station. Prior to the 1971 establishment of Amtrak, the Penn Central (combined company after the merger of the New York Central and the Pennsylvania Railroad), ran these St. Louis-New York City trains through Terre Haute: Penn Texas and the Spirit of St. Louis. Until 1965 the C&EI ran the Dixie Flyer from Chicago through Terre Haute, to Evansville, Nashville, Atlanta, and on to Jacksonville, Florida. Until 1968 the C&EI ran the Georgian from Chicago through Terre Haute, on the same route to Atlanta. Up to the same time, the C&EI ran through Terre Haute the New Orleans-bound Humming Bird.

Notable people 

 Charles G. Abrell, United States Marine and Medal of Honor recipient
 Ray Arcel, boxing coach
 Birch Bayh, former U.S. Senator from Indiana, former Speaker of the Indiana House of Representatives
 Max Carey, Hall of Fame Major League Baseball player
 Helen Corey, cookbook author, television producer, educator, first Syrian-American to hold elected office in Indiana
 Scatman Crothers, musician and actor
 Eugene V. Debs, Indiana State Senator, five-time American presidential candidate, and leader of the Socialist Party of America
 Terry Dischinger, National Basketball Association player, NBA Rookie of the Year; Chicago Zephyrs, Detroit Pistons and Portland Trail Blazers
 Theodore Dreiser, author of Sister Carrie and An American Tragedy
 Paul Dresser, singer, songwriter (On the Banks of the Wabash, Far Away), and actor
 Zhivago Duncan, contemporary artist
 Max Ehrmann, author of "Desiderata"
 Philip Jose Farmer, speculative fiction and fantasy author of the Riverworld series
 Ruben Gonzales (tennis), professional tennis player
 Tony Hulman, former owner of the Indianapolis Motor Speedway
 Tommy John, pitcher for the Chicago White Sox and New York Yankees
 Howard Andrew Jones, American speculative fiction and fantasy author and editor
 Emil W. Leipziger, rabbi
 Bobby Leonard, former coach of the Indiana Pacers
 Clyde Lovellette, Hall of Fame National Basketball Association player
 Mick Mars, guitarist of Mötley Crüe
 Ernestine Myers, dancer and dance educator
 Art Nehf, an American baseball pitcher who played 15 seasons in Major League Baseball, mostly for the New York Giants
 Teresa Hord Owens, General Minister and President of the Christian Church (Disciples of Christ)
 John T. Scott, Justice of the Indiana Supreme Court
 Janet Scudder, sculptor, painter, and high school art teacher
 Abe Silverstein, aerospace engineer
 John Gould Stephenson, Librarian of Congress
 Bill Thompson (voice actor), voice of Droopy Dog and Wallace Wimple
 Margaret Hoberg Turrell, composer and philanthropist

Legends
One well known Terre Haute legend is the story of Stiffy Green, a stone bulldog that allegedly at one time guarded the mausoleum in Highland Lawn Cemetery of florist John G. Heinl, the brother-in-law of Eugene V. Debs and the father of journalist Robert Debs Heinl. The statue is now housed in the Vigo County Historical Society Museum, in Terre Haute.

In popular culture
Comedian Steve Martin referred to Terre Haute as "Nowhere, U.S.A." in an interview with Playboy in 1978. He made these claims after a performance in the same year where he stated that he had difficulty finding any open downtown restaurants. He then was invited back to take a tour of the city in December 1979. He then premiered his film The Jerk at one of the city's theatres. In Martin's 1982 film Dead Men Don't Wear Plaid, he mocked Terre Haute at the end. He saved the world from being decimated by a cheese bomb, and only Terre Haute was hit. Martin then says "Damn, and they were about to get a public library.

Sister cities
Terre Haute has three sister city relationships:
Tajimi, Gifu, Japan (established in 1960's)
Tambov, Russia

See also

List of attractions and events in Terre Haute, Indiana
List of people from Terre Haute, Indiana
List of place names of French origin in the United States
List of public art in Terre Haute, Indiana

References
Specific

General
 
 Nolan, John Matthew "2,543 Days: A History of the Hotel at the Grand Rapids Dam on the Wabash River" Discusses Charles T. Hinde, one of the silent investors of the Hotel del Coronado and how the Hotel del Coronado influenced the Grand Rapids Hotel in Wabash County, Illinois.

External links

Terre Haute Tribune-Star
City of Terre Haute, Indiana website
Terre Haute Convention and Visitor's Bureau
Hometown: A Journey Through Terre Haute, IN: A documentary about Terre Haute in the 1920s

 
Cities in Indiana
County seats in Indiana
National Road
Populated places established in the 1810s
Cities in Vigo County, Indiana
Terre Haute metropolitan area